Championship Wrestling (CW) is an American professional wrestling promotion and television program that airs on KDOC-TV Los Angeles and carried in first-run syndication in the United States. The television series premiered on September 17, 2010.  The promotion's president and on-camera interviewer is David Marquez.

CWFH serves as the flagship promotion of the United Wrestling Network (UWN). Until 2012, the promotion and show was known as NWA Championship Wrestling from Hollywood (NWA Hollywood) and was a member of the National Wrestling Alliance.

History
NWA Hollywood was originally produced with Big Vision Entertainment and taped at Columbia Square Studios in Hollywood.
After launching on KDOC-TV, the Galaxy Theater in Santa Ana became the promotion's home venue. On 12 May 2012, NWA Hollywood ran its first non-TV event in its history, with Scorpio Sky vs. Nick Madrid as it main event.

NWA Hollywood was originally booked by Adam Pearce; he was replaced by Joey Ryan in January 2011. On August 4, 2011, Ryan was relieved of his duties.

On September 9, 2012, David Marquez announced that the promotion had left the NWA.

On August 13, 2013, Championship Wrestling from Hollywood moved to the Oceanview Pavilion in Port Hueneme, California, with tapings held on the 2nd and 4th Sunday of each month. That same day, Matt Striker joined the announce team and The Grappler made his initial on-camera debut as a manager. On October 22, 2013, CWFH and nine other wrestling promotions created a new governing body known as the United Wrestling Network (UWN).

In 2017, Championship Wrestling from Hollywood would briefly re-establish a partnership with the NWA, now under the ownership of William Patrick Corgan (also known as Billy Corgan of the Smashing Pumpkins), wherein Nick Aldis feuded with Tim Storm for the NWA World Heavyweight Championship.

In September 2020, Aron Haddad was made the promotion's booker. On October 3, 2020, Marquez stepped down as executive producer, naming Nick Bonnano as the new EP.

Due to the Omicron variant of COVID-19 causing the cancellation of several UWN television tapings, the show would briefly go on hiatus after its September 11, 2021 episode. The show would return with its October 23 episode as it, along with other Championship Wrestling programs, would later feature footage from the November 20th UWN Primetime Live event, and "best of" clip shows.

On February 17, 2022, the United Wrestling Network announced in a press release that they will be merging CWFH with the Arizona and Atlanta Championship Wrestling promotions into a singular entity under the Championship Wrestling presented by CarShield branding. The first taping for the new show will take place at the Irvine Improv in Irvine, California on March 22.

Championships

Current champions

Defunct championships

Other accomplishments

Roster

The wrestlers featured on Championship Wrestling From Hollywood, consisting mainly of independent freelancers, take part in scripted feuds and storylines. Wrestlers are portrayed as either villains or heroes in the scripted events that build tension and culminate in a wrestling match. Active wrestlers and on-screen talent appear on Championship Wrestling From Hollywood and at live events. Personnel is organized below by their role in Championship Wrestling From Hollywood. Their ring name is on the left, and their real name is on the right.

Male wrestlers

Female wrestlers

Other on-air talent

Broadcast team

Referees

Backstage personnel

See also
 UWN Primetime Live
 List of National Wrestling Alliance territories
 List of independent wrestling promotions in the United States

References

External links
 "Championship Wrestling from Hollywood" TV series website

 https://www.fite.tv/search/?q=cwfh

American professional wrestling television series
National Wrestling Alliance shows
2010 American television series debuts
Professional wrestling in Los Angeles
United Wrestling Network